The Strays is a 2023 British horror thriller film written and directed by Nathaniel Martello-White, in his directorial debut. In the film, a woman named Neve (Ashley Madekwe) is a biracial upper-class woman leading an idyllic life with her family. As a socialite in her community and the deputy headmistress of a private school, Neve's privileged life is jeopardized when her troubled past resurfaces to undermine everything she has built.

Plot
Cheryl, a Black woman, is living in an undisclosed location in England. She expresses concerns about discrimination and financial difficulties to someone on the phone. The subsequent scenes show her rejecting phone calls from her spouse and leaving a message on the fridge about going to the hair salon.

Several years later, we are introduced to Neve, a fair skinned Black woman married to Ian, a white man, with two biracial children, Sebastian and Mary. She is disdainful of anything associated with "blackness." Neve works at her kids’ school as a deputy headmistress, and plans to host a fundraising gala at her home. She often gets visions of black individuals and gets disturbed. At the fundraising gala, Neve confronts two black individuals that she believes to be strangers; they address her as their mother.

Flashbacks to five days prior, with "Carl and Dione" being the focus of the story, the two black individuals Neve has been seeing. The two are on an unknown mission that involves staying at a hotel, with Carl taking on the name "Marvin" and getting a job as a school janitor while Dione, taking the name “Abigail” to work as an assistant in Ian's office. They befriend Neve's children, with Dione inviting Mary to the hotel room for drinking and partying, while Carl invites Sebastian to smoke after his basketball game. Afterwards, Carl convinces Sebastian to brutally attack his school bully.

In the present day, it is revealed that Neve is Cheryl, and Carl and Dione are her children. She meets them at a diner, Neve gives them ten thousand pounds each, in order to help them back on their feet as they return to London. However, Carl and Dione break into Neve's house. Carl takes everyone’s phones and dumps them in the sink, where he turns on the water that starts to overflow the living room. They claim it’s Dione’s birthday and they should celebrate as a family. Carl and Dione force the family to order Uber Eats.

Carl confronts Neve for trying to pay them off, which was unknown to the rest of her family. This leads to Ian threatening a divorce, however, Dione intervenes and suggests playing a board game. Neve, who is visibly upset, vomits, afterwards appears to adopt a new and happy persona, and the group begins to play Scrabble. Carl becomes annoyed and forfeits the game before demanding that Ian accompany him to the family's gym. There, Carl coerces Ian to lift increasingly heavy weights until he is unable to hold them, and the weight falls on him, resulting in his apparent death.

Meanwhile, after the Uber Eat driver arrives, Neve tells the group she will tip the driver and be right back; she does not return. The driver’s engine starts up and drives away, implying that Neve has left with him. Mary and Sebastian are left standing in the flooded living room with Dione and Carl, as Neve has now abandoned her second set of children.

Cast
Ashley Madekwe as Neve / Cheryl
Bukky Bakray as Abigail
Jorden Myrie as Marvin
Samuel Small as Sebastian
Maria Almeida as Mary 
Justin Salinger as Ian
Lucy Liemann as Amanda
Tom Andrews as Barry
Rob Jarvis as Robert
Michael Warburton as Kenneth 
Alastair Ellery as Keith
Vanessa Bailey as Elle
Joanna Brookes as Betty

Production
The film is produced by Valentina Brazzini, Tristan Goligher and Rob Watson. Emilie Levienaise-Farrouch composed the score.

Principal photography took place between September and November 2021, in London, Suffolk and Berkshire counties.

Release
The Strays was released on Netflix on 22 February 2023.

Reception
On the review aggregator website Rotten Tomatoes, the film holds an approval rating of 52% based on 23 reviews, and an average rating of 2 out of 10.

References

External links
 
 
 

2020s British films
2023 horror thriller films
2023 directorial debut films
English-language Netflix original films
Black British films
2020s English-language films
British horror thriller films
2023 horror films
2023 films
Films shot in London
Films shot in Suffolk
Films shot in Berkshire